Stanley A. Meholchick (January 1, 1917 – August 21, 1998) was a Democratic member of the Pennsylvania House of Representatives.

References

1917 births
1998 deaths
People from Ashley, Pennsylvania
Democratic Party members of the Pennsylvania House of Representatives
20th-century American politicians